Southern Bancorp is a community development financial institution 
headquartered in Arkadelphia, Arkansas. It was founded in 1986 as Southern Development Bancorporation, and is often referred to simply as "Southern". 

With 43 locations, the organization focuses most of their work in the Arkansas Delta and Mississippi Delta. Southern's community-development work in these areas has directly improved various aspects of resident's lives through different projects such as the Delta Bridge Project, The Arkadelphia Promise, and numerous other sponsorships and projects.

Origin
In 1986, then Arkansas Governor Bill Clinton partnered with the Winthrop Rockefeller Foundation to help combat different issues plaguing the state. From this initiative, various nonprofit development agencies came together to form Southern Bancorp.

Structure
There are three entities that make up Southern Bancorp:
 Southern Bancorp Bank (SBB)
 Southern Bancorp Community Partners (SBCP)
 Southern Bancorp Incorporated (SBI)

References

External links
 Southern Bancorp's website

1986 establishments in Arkansas
Banks based in Arkansas
Banks established in 1986
Clark County, Arkansas
Community development financial institutions